The Mixed duet free routine competition of the synchronised swimming events at the 2015 World Aquatics Championships was held on 28 and 30 July 2015.

Results
The preliminary round was held on 28 July at 12:25. The final was held on 30 July at 19:15.

Green denotes finalists

References

Mixed duet free routine
World Aquatics Championships